The 1912–13 Scottish Districts season is a record of all the rugby union matches for Scotland's district teams.

History

Edinburgh District beat Glasgow District in the Inter-City match

Results

Inter-City

Glasgow District:

Edinburgh District:

Other Scottish matches

Trial matches

Blues Trial:

Whites Trial: 

Scotland Probables: 

Scotland Possibles:

English matches

No other District matches played.

International matches

Combined Scottish Districts:

South Africa:

References

1912–13 in Scottish rugby union
Scottish Districts seasons